Loyalists were colonists in the Thirteen Colonies who stayed loyal to the British Crown during the American Revolutionary War, opposing the Patriots.

A 
 Rev. John Agnew (d. 1812, New Brunswick), served a Church of England parish in Suffolk, Virginia
 Andrew Allen (1740–1825), Pennsylvanian Delegate to the Second Continental Congress
 William Allen (1704–1780), Chief Justice of Pennsylvania and former mayor of Philadelphia
 Brigadier General Benedict Arnold (January 14, 1741 [O.S. January 3, 1740/1741] – June 14, 1801), commissioned in 1780; originally a Patriot general
 John Askin (1739–1815), trader and land speculator at Detroit

B 
 John Bacon (died 1783), New Jersey privateer and marauder who preyed on Patriots in and around the Pine Barrens and South East New Jersey 
 Thomas Henry Barclay (1753–1830), New York City lawyer and later Governor of Nova Scotia
 Dr. Richard Bayley (1745–1801), New York physician and father of American-born saint Elizabeth Ann Seton
 Rev. John Beardsley (1732–1809), Anglican minister in Poughkeepsie, New York and Fishkill, New York who, in 1778, he served as chaplain to Beverley Robinson's Loyal American Regiment
 Joseph Bettys, resident of the Town of Ballston, New York; hanged as a spy in 1782
 Christopher Billopp (1738 – March 29, 1827), Staten Island resident who commanded a Tory detachment 
 Sampson Salter Blowers (March 10, 1742 – October 25, 1842), Boston, Massachusetts attorney
 Amos Botsford (1744–1812), Yale College graduate and judge
 Jonathan Boucher (1738–1804), Church of England priest in Maryland and Virginia and tutor to John Parke Custis, the stepson of George Washington
 William Augustus Bowles (1763–1805), also known as Estajoca, served with the Maryland Loyalist Battalion and was a Maryland-born English adventurer and organizer of Native American attempts to create their own state outside of Euro-American control.
 Joseph Brant Thayendenegea (1743–1807), Mohawk war leader
 Molly Brant (1736–1796), also known as Mary Brant, Konwatsi'tsiaienni, and Degonwadonti; influential Mohawk leader and sister of Joseph Brant
 Elisabeth Brewer served as a nurse in the Continental Army while covertly gathering information for the British in New Jersey
 Thomas Brown (1750–1825), LTC commanding King's Rangers in Georgia
 Brigadier General Montfort Browne (fl. 1760–1780), commanding Prince of Wales American Regiment, 1777
 William Bull II (1710–1791), lieutenant governor of the province of South Carolina, 1759–1775
 Colonel John Butler (1728–1796), commanded Butler's Rangers in the Mohawk Valley
 Walter Butler (1752–1781), Captain in Butler's Rangers; son of John Butler
 Rev. Mather Byles (1706–1788), Harvard graduate and prominent Boston clergyman

C 

 William Caldwell (–1822), Scots-Irish who served in Butler's Rangers 
 Benedict Swingate Calvert ( to 1732–1788), Judge of the Land Office, Maryland
 Elizabeth Calvert (1731 – 1788), wife and cousin of Loyalist politician Benedict Swingate Calvert
 Rev. John Camm (1718–1778), seventh president of the College of William and Mary
 Lt. Col. James Chalmers (died 1806), Commander, First Battalion of Maryland Loyalists; author of anti-"Common Sense" pamphlet "Plain Truth" in 1776
 Dr. Benjamin Church (1734–disappeared at sea 1778), Director Medical General Patriot Army and a Loyalist spy
 Richard Clarke (1711–1795), Boston merchant
 Christian Daniel Claus (1727–1787), commissioner of Indian affairs 
 Cheney Clow (1734–1788), Delaware plantation owner; served earlier as a British officer; involved in an act of hostility on April 18, 1778 which is known today as Cheney Clow's Rebellion
 Sir Isaac Coffin, 1st Baronet (1759–1839), Royal Navy officer and member of a prominent Massachusetts Loyalist family
 John Connolly (–1813), planned with Lord Dunmore to raise a regiment of Loyalists and Indians in Canada called the Loyal Foresters and lead them to Virginia to help Dunmore put down the rebellion
 Myles Cooper (1735–1785), Church of England clergyman President of King's College in New York City
 John Singleton Copley (1738–1815), innovative painter
 William Cunningham (died 1787, Nassau, Bahamas), earned the name ″Bloody Bill″ for his exploits against Backcountry South Carolina Patriots

D 

 James De Lancey (1746–1804), of Westchester County, New York, led a Loyalist unit known as "De Lancey's Cowboys" and was known as the "Outlaw of the Bronx"
 Brigadier General Oliver De Lancey (1718–1785), commanded De Lancey's Brigade 1776
 Stephen De Lancey (1738–1809), Loyalist lawyer and political figure in New York state and Nova Scotia
 Abraham de Peyster, Officer of King's American Regiment
 Colonel Arent DePeyster (1736–1822), Officer of the 8th Regiment of Foot
 Colonel Andrew Deveaux (1758–1812), Colonel in South Carolina Loyalist militia
 Doan Outlaws, fallen Pennsylvania Quaker family of British spies and bandits
 Margaret Green Draper (1727–), Boston printer and journalist; one of the first American women to run an independent business; United Empire Loyalist; supported the British
 Moses Dunbar (1746–1777), Executed for treason in Connecticut after joining the King's American Regiment

E 

 Sir Robert Eden, 1st Baronet, of Maryland (–1784), Provincial Governor of Maryland and last Royal Governor of Maryland
 Jacob Ellegood (1742–1801), Virginia-born farmer who became a political figure in early New Brunswick

F 

 Thomas Fairfax, 6th Lord Fairfax of Cameron (1693–1781), of Virginia; the only British peer resident in Colonial America
 David Fanning (1755–1825), commander of militia in North Carolina, and later Member of the Legislative Assembly of New Brunswick, 1791–1801
 Edmund Fanning (1739–1818), commanded militia in the War of the Regulation and Loyalist militia in the American Revolution; later Lieutenant Governor of Nova Scotia and Saint John's Island
 David Farnsworth (died 1778), British agent hanged for his participation in a plot to undermine the American economy by distributing counterfeit currency
 Elizabeth Graeme Fergusson, Loyalist who wrote poems lamenting her husband's desertion of her; these shared the grief of herself and other women left behind
 William Franklin (–1813), Governor of New Jersey; son of Benjamin Franklin
 Rebecca Franks (1760–1823), prominent member of Loyalist society in Philadelphia, Pennsylvania during the American Revolution

G 

 Grace Growden Galloway (1727–1783), Loyalist who documented her fight for property rights
 Joseph Galloway (1731–1803), Member of the Pennsylvania Provincial Assembly
 Alexander Garden (1720–1791), Scottish-born naturalist who lived in Charles Town, South Carolina until fleeing to London in 1783
  Dr. Silvester Gardiner (1708–1786), Massachusetts physician, visionary land developer; in 1774 added his name to a letter addressed to Massachusetts Royal Governor Thomas Hutchinson, affirming his allegiance to the Loyalist cause
 David George (–1810), African-American Baptist preacher and a Black Loyalist from the American South who escaped to British lines in Savannah, Georgia; later accepted transport to Nova Scotia and land there; eventually resettled in Freetown, Sierra Leone
 Abraham Gesner (1756–1851), served with the King's Orange Rangers during the American Revolution; purchased a commission of major in the British Army
 Simon Girty (1741–1818), British liaison with the Indians
 John Goodrich (1722–1785), Loyalist privateer
 Harrison Gray (1711–1794), wealthy merchant; Treasurer and Receiver-General for the Province of Massachusetts Bay

H 
 John Hamilton (died 1816), commander of the Royal North Carolina Regiment, later British consul in Norfolk, Virginia
 Harpe brothers, North Carolina bandits and allegedly America's first serial killers
 Thomas Hickey, a guard in the Commander-in-Chief's Guard of George Washington, who was executed for mutiny and sedition after planning to defect to the British 
 John Howe (1754–1835), printer of the Massachusetts Gazette and Boston Weekly News-Letter
 Thomas Hutchinson (1711–1780), last royal Governor of Massachusetts

I 
 Charles Inglis (1734–1816), first Bishop of the Anglican Diocese of Nova Scotia
 Ralph Inman (1713–1788), Boston, Massachusetts merchant

J 
 Samuel Jarvis (1720–1780), Stamford, Connecticut official forced out of office due to his Loyalism; father of William Jarvis
 William Jarvis (1756–1817), New Yorker who served in the Queen's Rangers
 Edward Jessup (1735–1816), Colonel of Jessup's Loyal Rangers near Albany, New York; and his brothers Ebenezer and Joseph
 Sir John Johnson (1741–1820), commander of the King's Royal Regiment of New York
 Thomas Jones (1731–1792), Recorder of New York City, 1769–1773; historian who authored History of New York During the Revolutionary War and of the Leading Events in the Other Colonies at That Period; fled to Britain and died in Hoddesdon, Hertfordshire

K 

 Boston King (–1802), Black Loyalist; settled in Nova Scotia and later emigrated to Sierra Leone, where he helped found Freetown and became the first Methodist missionary to African indigenous people

L 
 Elisha Leavitt (1714–1790), Hingham, Massachusetts merchant and landowner
 Sir Egerton Leigh, 1st Baronet (1733–1781), South Carolina colonial official
 Daniel Leonard (1740–1829), son of a Taunton, Massachusetts Patriot; later served as the Chief Justice of the Bermudas 
 Isaac Low (1735–1791), delegate for New York to the First Continental Congress in 1774 and to New York Provincial Congress; first President of the New York Chamber of Commerce
 George Ludlow, New York judge

M 

 David Mathews, Princeton University graduate and Mayor of New York City; subsequent administrator of Cape Breton, Nova Scotia
 William McCormick (1742–1815), North Carolina merchant
 Colonel Alexander McKee (–1799), liaison between the British and the Shawnees
 George Milligan, Surgeon of the Royal Garrison Battalion. 
 Benjamin Milliken, founder of Ellsworth Maine, mill and ship owner 
 James Moody, Lieutenant, First New Jersey Volunteers, March 1781
 John Murray, Representative to the Great and General Court of the Province of Massachusetts Bay

O 

 Rev. Jonathan Odell (1737–1818), New Jersey Anglican clergyman and Loyalist poet
 Peter Oliver (1713–1791), Massachusetts judge briefly satirized in "McFingal"

P 
 Richard Pearis (1725–1794), Indian trader and pioneer settler of Upstate South Carolina
 Frederick Philipse III (1720–1786), militia colonel and politician in New York; last lord of Philipsburg Manor

R 
 John Randolph (1727–1784), King's Attorney for Virginia
 James Rivington (1734–1802), Loyalist editor of Rivington Gazette; Patriot spy
 Colonel Beverley Robinson (1723–1792), of New York, Loyal American Regiment
 Lieutenant-Colonel Robert Rogers (1731–1795), commander of Rogers' Rangers/Queen's Rangers to 1777 (now The Queen's York Rangers (1st American Regiment) (RCAC)), innovator of ranging tactics
 Timothy Ruggles (1711–1795), colonial military leader, Massachusetts jurist and politician, who served as president of the 1765 Stamp Act Congress

S 
 Peggy Shippen (1760–1804), Philadelphia socialite and second wife of Benedict Arnold
 Philip Skene (1725–1810), colonial New York "patroon" and British officer, of Scottish birth
 Brigadier Cortlandt Skinner (1727–1799), commanded New Jersey Volunteers, September 4, 1776
 Lieutenant-Colonel William Stark (1724–1776), of New Hampshire; brother of John Stark, a major general in the Continental Army
 George H. Steuart (1700–1784), planter; Judge of the Land Office, Maryland
 Joel Stone (1749–1833), Connecticut merchant who helped Loyalists escape to British-controlled part of the Colonies, including David Mathews

T 
 Sir Benjamin Thompson (Count Rumford) (1753–1814), of Massachusetts, Royal official and scientist, established the Royal Institution in England.
 Consider Tiffany (1732–1796), Connecticut storekeeper and sergeant during the French and Indian War 
 William Tryon (1729–1788), Royal Governor of North Carolina
 Colonel Tye (–1780), New Jersey native who escaped from slavery and achieved fame leading a brigade of partisans in raids against Patriots in Monmouth County.

V 
 Peter van Schaack (1747–1832), New York lawyer
 John Vardill (1749–1811), New York City-born British spy, clergyman, educator, pamphleteer, playwright, and poet

W 

 Sir John Wentworth, 1st Baronet (1737–1820), last Royal Governor of New Hampshire at the time of the American Revolution; Lieutenant-Governor of Nova Scotia
 Charles Woodmason (–1789), Church of England missionary in South Carolina, Virginia, and Maryland, diarist, poet, and corresponding member of the Royal Society of Arts, London. He authored an article published (under the pseudonym "Sylvanus") in the South Carolina Gazette and Country-Journal on March 28, 1769 chiding the local Patriot leaders for hypocrisy and asked pointedly how they could justly complain of "No taxation without representation!" regarding Acts of Parliament, while these very same powerful men denied the Carolina Backcountry any representation in South Carolina's Assembly, yet expected them to pay taxes passed by that body.
 James Wright (1716–1785), last Royal Governor of Georgia, buried in Westminster Abbey

X, Y, Z 
 John Joachim Zubly (1724–1781), Reformed minister and delegate from Georgia to the Continental Congress

See also
 Loyalists fighting in the American Revolution
 List of American Loyalist Units

References

Loyalists in the American Revolution